The Peshawar Zalmi is a franchise cricket team that competed in the Pakistan Super League. The team is based in Peshawar, Khyber Pakhtunkhwa, Pakistan. They were one of the six teams that competed in the 2020 season. The team was coached by Daren Sammy and captained by Wahab Riaz.

Management and coaching staff

Season standings

Ladder

League matches

Playoffs

Eliminator 1

References

External links 
 Team records in 2020 at ESPNcricinfo

2020 Pakistan Super League
2020 in Pakistani cricket
2020